is a Japanese politician of the Democratic Party of Japan, a member of the House of Councillors in the Diet (national legislature). A native of Mimata, Miyazaki and graduate of Chuo University, he was elected for the first time in 2007.

References

External links 
  in Japanese.

Members of the House of Councillors (Japan)
Chuo University alumni
Living people
1960 births
Democratic Party of Japan politicians